Dionne Lee (born 1988) is an American photographer working in film, collage, and video to explores ideas of power, survival, and history.

Early life and career 

Lee grew up in Harlem, New York. Lee has employed collage methods in her photography work, sometimes gluing together silver gelatin photographic negatives to create a new work. Her work is included in the collections of the Museum of Modern Art and the Museum of Fine Arts, Houston.

In 2010 Lee graduated with a BAFA of Fine Arts from Alfred University. In 2017 she graduated with a MFA from the California College of the Arts in San Francisco.

Works 

Lee's photography explores landscape as both a site of refuge as well as trauma. In her work, Lee explores her relationship to spaces by interrogating the history of places, as well as the role of the photographer and the purpose of the images. For example, Lee grew up in Harlem and later learned the history of Seneca Village, a settlement of free Black Americans who were later forcibly removed from that site.

Lee is part of the inaugural cohort of artists invited to participate in Unseen California, a project that engages with artists to research and create site specific artworks on public lands in California.

In the soundtrack to “Companion Pieces: New Photography 2020," an internet based display at the Museum of Modern Art in New York, Lee says the pictures are a praise to her predecessors who explored North on the Underground Railroad. The works bespeak Lee's advantage in investigating the body's relationship to the land, and in instruments that work with endurance in the wild, a capacity pertinent to both social history and environmental change.

Major exhibitions 
Some of Lee’s major exhibitions include Trap and Lean To at Light Work in Syracuse, NY,  Continuum: Aspen Mays + Dionne Lee, Silver Eye Center for Photography, Pittsburgh, PA and Running, rigging, wading, at the Interface Gallery in Oakland, CA.

Public collections 
Lee’s work can be found in different public collections around the United States. Her work is featured in the Museum of Modern Art, New York, NY, New Orleans Museum of Art, New Orleans, LA, The Museum of Fine Arts Houston, Houston, TX, Princeton University Art Museum, Princeton, NJ, Florida State University Museum of Fine Arts, Tallahassee, FL, Light Work, Syracuse, NY, Center for Photography at Woodstock Collection at SUNY New Paltz, NY

References

Living people
1988 births
Artists from New York City
21st-century American artists
21st-century American photographers
21st-century American women artists
Alfred University alumni
California College of the Arts alumni